A biphosphate is any of the following (due to fluctuations in chemical nomenclature over the centuries): 
 One of the two phosphate ions which can be singular to 1 metal ion
 Monohydrogen phosphate, commonly known as hydrogenphosphate, also known as biphosphate(2-).
 Dihydrogen phosphate, also known as biphosphate(1-).
 Any salt of phosphoric acid in which only one of the hydrogen atoms has been replaced by a metal ion
 Calcium biphosphate is monocalcium  phosphate
 Potassium biphosphate is monopotassium phosphate
 Magnesium biphosphate is monomagnesium phosphate
 Sodium biphosphate is monosodium phosphate
 Any diphosphate, which may be:
 Any pyrophosphate
 Any simple pyrophosphate salt (which have no hydrogen atoms)
 Calcium pyrophosphate
 Tetrasodium pyrophosphate
 Zinc pyrophosphate
 Any organic pyrophosphate or any organic molecule with two phosphate groups
 Adenosine diphosphate
 Deoxyadenosine diphosphate
 Cytidine diphosphate
 Deoxycytidine diphosphate
 Guanosine diphosphate
 Deoxyguanosine diphosphate
 Thiamine pyrophosphate
 Thymidine diphosphate
 Uridine diphosphate
 Any salt or ester with two phosphate groups
 Hexestrol diphosphate